This is a list of streams and rivers in Sudan, arranged geographically by drainage basin. There is an alphabetic list at the end of this article.

Flowing into the Mediterranean  
Nile
Atbara River
Mareb River (or Gash River) (only reaches the Atbara in times of flood)
Tekezé River (or Setit)
Angereb River (or Greater Angereb River)
Blue Nile 
Rahad River
Dinder River
White Nile
Adar River
Yabus River
Bahr el Ghazal
Jur River
Bahr al-Arab
Adda River
Umbelasha River
Lol River
 Sobat River :
 Baro River
 Pibor River :
 Akobo River

Flowing into the Red Sea 
 Barka River

Flowing into endorheic basins

Libyan Desert
Wadi Howar (remnant of the Yellow Nile, an ancient tributary of the Nile)

Lake Kundi
Ibrah River

Alphabetical list

A to M 
 Adda River, Sudan - Angereb River - Atbarah River
 Bahr al-Arab - Barka River
 Dinder River
 Geni River
 Ibrah River
 Mareb River (Gash River)

N to Z
 Nile River
 Rahad River
 Tekezé River - Tiwal River
 Umbelasha River
 Wadi Howar - White Nile
 Yabus River

See also
List of rivers of South Sudan

References

Sudan
Rivers